Bangalore Hockey Stadium, also known as KSHA Hockey Stadium, is a field hockey stadium at Akkithimmanahalli, Bangalore, Karnataka, India. It is the home of the Karnataka Lions of the World Series Hockey. It has a seating capacity of 7,000 people.

The stadium hosted seven home matches of Karnataka Lions in World Series Hockey. It will also host the first semi-final of World Series Hockey in 2012.

History
Akkithimmanhalli lake was breached in the 1970s as part of a Malaria Eradication Drive and the Hockey stadium constructed in its place.

References

External links
Hockey in Bangalore
Lake By Chance

Field hockey venues in India
Sports venues in Bangalore
Year of establishment missing